The 1975 Wake Forest Demon Deacons football team was an American football team that represented Wake Forest University during the 1975 NCAA Division I football season. In their third season under head coach Chuck Mills, the Demon Deacons compiled a 3–8 record and finished in fourth place in the Atlantic Coast Conference.

Schedule

Team leaders

References

Wake Forest
Wake Forest Demon Deacons football seasons
Wake Forest Demon Deacons football